Criminal Macabre: A Cal McDonald Mystery is a comic book series starring Cal McDonald, an antihero American comic book character created in 1990 by writer Steve Niles. The character's adventures have been published by Dark Horse Comics and later IDW Publishing.

Cal himself is akin to John Constantine, a DC Comics paranormal detective. He takes illicit drugs, and befriends a network of ghouls to assist him in his cases. Policemen do not really care to be involved with Cal.

Publishing history

Cal McDonald's first story, entitled "Big-Head", was released in 1990 as part of the anthology comic Fly in My Eye: Daughters of Fly In My Eye from Arcane Comix, with art by Jim Whiting. That story led directly to the four-part "Hairball", serialized in Dark Horse Presents #102-105 in 1996. Hairball was later printed as a one-shot comic.

Cal's subsequent appearances were in two 2002 novels, Savage Membrane, and Guns, Drugs and Monsters. In the latter, Cal relocated to Los Angeles, after following a living, severed head searching for its body.

Following the novels, Cal made his return to comic book form in the Dark Horse Comics mini-series, Criminal Macabre (2003) with Ben Templesmith as artist. The two would pair up again for a one-shot comic titled "Love Me Tenderloin" in 2004. Cal's adventures have continued in other mini-series such as "Last Train to Deadsville" and "Supernatural Freak Machine", both with artist Kelley Jones, where he re-encountered the severed head. Next, he starred in the mini-series "Two Red Eyes" with artist Kyle Hotz, where he does battle with the vampire Nosferatu. He also made a brief appearance in short story format in the Dark Horse Comics released title Drawing on your Nightmares, again with Ben Templesmith as artist. From there, he went on to do "My Demon Baby" and "Cell Block 666" with artist Nick Stakal. The series "Two Red Eyes" started a trend continuing in "My Demon Baby", where action film actor Thomas Jane would portray Cal on the issue's covers, stylized by artist Tim Bradstreet.

During the release of some of the comic book series there was another novel released in 2003 titled Dial M for Monster: A Cal McDonald Collection. This novel included several short stories featuring Cal.

Criminal Macabre: The Complete Cal McDonald Stories collects the entire catalogue of Cal McDonald short stories (not the comic stories) until this point. It was released on December 26 of 2007.

Series titles
Hairball (IDW one-shot, collected from Dark Horse Presents v1 102-105)
Criminal Macabre (Dark Horse 5-issue mini-series, 2003)
Love Me Tenderloin (Dark Horse one-shot, Criminal Macabre 6)
Drawing on your Nightmares (Dark Horse short story entitled Letter From B.S.)
Last Train to Deadsville (Dark Horse 4-issue mini-series, 2004)
Supernatural Freak Machine (IDW published 1-3; Dark Horse included issues 4 and 5 in the Criminal Macabre Omnibus Vol. 1 and the Supernatural Freak Machine collection)
Feat of Clay (Dark Horse one-shot, 2006)
Two Red Eyes (Dark Horse 4-issue mini-series, 2007)
My Demon Baby (Dark Horse 4-issue mini-series, 2008)
Cell Block 666 (Dark Horse 4-issue mini-series, 2009)
Call Me Monster (Dark Horse FCBD 2011 one-shot)
When Freaks Collide (Dark Horse one-shot crossover with The Goon)
No Peace for Dead Men (Dark Horse one-shot, 2011)
Die, Die, My Darling! (Dark Horse one-shot, collected from Dark Horse Presents v2 4-6, 2012)
Final Night (Dark Horse 4-issue crossover with 30 Days of Night)
They Fight by Night (Dark Horse one-shot, 2012)
The Iron Spirit (Dark Horse oversized deluxe hardcover one-shot, 2012)
The Eyes of Frankenstein (Dark Horse 4-issue mini-series, 2013)
The Third Child (Dark Horse 4-issue mini-series, 2014)
The Big Bleed Out (Dark Horse 4-issue mini-series, 2019)
Spirit of the Demon (Dark Horse graphic novel, 2022)

Collected editions
The series has been collected into a number of trade paperbacks:

In other media

Novels

Film
A Cal McDonald film is said to be on the way, however due to the nature of the character, Steve Niles does not want to compromise or "water down" Cal McDonald, making it tough to find a studio that will finance the film as is.

Universal Pictures signed a deal to produce a Criminal Macabre movie with Kyle Ward scripting. It was set for release in 2010.

Notes

References

Cal McDonald at IDW Publishing
Criminal Macabre at Dark Horse

 at Variety Online

External links
My Demon Baby #1 review, Comics Bulletin, September 24, 2007

Fantasy comics
Occult detective fiction
Comics by Steve Niles